Achaea nigristriata is a species of moth of the family Erebidae. It is found in Tanzania.

This species has a wingspan from 55mm and a length of the forewings of 25mm.

References

Endemic fauna of Tanzania
Moths described in 1979
Achaea (moth)
Insects of Tanzania
Erebid moths of Africa